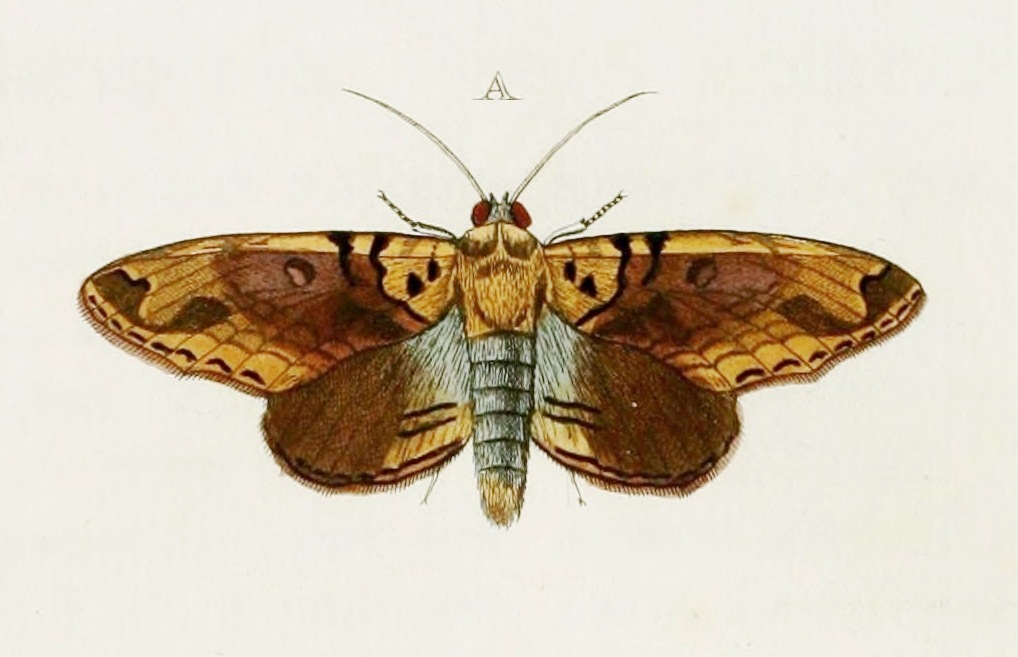
- Pararcte schneideriana

Scientific classification
- Kingdom: Animalia
- Phylum: Arthropoda
- Class: Insecta
- Order: Lepidoptera
- Superfamily: Noctuoidea
- Family: Noctuidae
- Genus: Pararcte; Hampson, 1926

= Pararcte =

Genus of moths

Pararcte is a genus of moths of the family Noctuidae. The genus was erected by George Hampson in 1926.

== Species ==
- Pararcte immanis (Walker, 1858) Dominican Republic
- Pararcte schneideriana (Stoll, [1782]) Suriname
